The Brayford Island is a man-made island that lies in the Brayford Pool in the centre of Lincoln in England. A single willow tree covers the island. It is also known as Swan Island as it is a site for nesting swans.

Speculation about the origins of the island has led it to be of historical interest.

References

External links 
 Heritage Connect Lincoln

Lake islands of England
Landforms of Lincolnshire
Lincoln, England